Wodynia  is a village in the administrative district of Gmina Tolkmicko, within Elbląg County, Warmian-Masurian Voivodeship, in northern Poland.

The village has a population of 40.

References

Wodynia